Ramaswamy Gnanasekaran (born 5 January 1954) is an Indian sprinter. He was the gold medalist in the 200 metres in the 1978 Asian Games. He later became a coach. He was given the Arjuna Award for athletics in 1978-79.

References

Athletes (track and field) at the 1978 Asian Games
Recipients of the Arjuna Award
Asian Games gold medalists for India
Asian Games silver medalists for India
Asian Games medalists in athletics (track and field)
Medalists at the 1978 Asian Games
Living people
Tamil sportspeople
1954 births
Athletes from Tamil Nadu